The chain of responsibility is a policy concept used in Australian transport legislation to place legal obligations on parties in the transport supply chain or across transport industries generally.  The concept was initially developed to apply in the heavy vehicle industry in regulated areas such as speeding, fatigue and mass,  loading and dimension.  It has since spread to other transport sectors, particularly in Victoria where it has been applied in laws which apply to the rail, bus, marine and taxi industries.

Background 
The chain of responsibility concept initially developed out of a recognition that unlawful behaviour by truck drivers is influenced and often controlled by the actions of other parties.  Concerns arose that transport laws had often focussed on the actions of drivers while failing to sufficiently recognise and regulate the actions of other key parties.  Chain of responsibility laws therefore seek to provide that these other parties cannot encourage, create incentives for, demand or allow drivers to undertake unlawful actions.

Victorian reforms

Transport Legislation Review 
In recent years, the chain of responsibility concept has been widely used as a basis for the reform of transport laws in the State of Victoria.  A major review of policy and legislation in that State, the Transport Legislation Review, has led to the concept being adapted for use in a number of new statutes including the Rail Safety Act 2006, the Bus Safety Act 2009 and the Marine Safety Act 2010.

Rail Safety Act 
Victoria faced the problem of ageing and inadequate transport legislation which failed to reflect modern policy.  During his second reading speech for a new rail safety statute in Victoria, the then Minister for Transport explained that -

"It is now recognised that this legislative framework has not kept pace with contemporary developments in safety regulation ... (T) the legislation does not establish a coherent chain of responsibility for the effective management of rail safety risks.  For example, unlike other modern safety legislation, the (current) Act does not identify the key parties or individuals who can control risks and does not impose performance-based safety responsibilities."

As a result, the Minister explained that -

"... the Bill now before the House and include the establishment of performance-based rail safety duties for rail operators, managers of rail infrastructure, contractors working on rolling stock or rail infrastructure, and rail safety workers including drivers and maintainers of rolling stock and infrastructure to ensure safety so far as reasonably practicable. This effectively imposes rail safety duties and obligations on each person in the rail industry who is in a position to affect safety and clearly identifies the roles and the safety chain of responsibility between them. The duties emphasise the responsibility of each participant to take steps as far as reasonably practicable to identify hazards and manage risks to safety that are within their control. This includes persons whose influence on safety exists 'upstream', such as persons involved in design, manufacture, maintenance, repair and modification of rail infrastructure and rolling stock."

The Rail Safety Act which emerged from that process therefore imposes a chain of responsibility across all key parties in the rail industry in Victoria who can influence safety outcomes. Accountability at law and sanctions and penalties are allocated according to the level of responsibility each party has for creating and managing safety risks.  Similar approaches were taken by the Transport Legislation Review in its work which led to new statutes in Victoria in the bus, marine and taxi industries.

National impact 
The Victorian work has had influence beyond that State.  Following the enactment of the Victorian Rail Safety Act in early 2006, Australian Transport Ministers approved a national Model Rail Safety Bill in June 2006 which drew heavily on the Victorian work including its adaption of the chain of responsibility concept.  The national Bill proposal has since been adopted by all other States and Territories which have passed Rail Safety Acts reflecting the framework.

See also
 Quintinshill rail crash
 Vicarious liability
 Transport Legislation Review
 Rail Safety Act
 Bus Safety Act
 Transport Integration Act

References

External links
 National Transport Commission
 Department of Transport, Victoria
 DOT, Transport Legislation Review
 Chain of Responsibility definition

Supply chain management
Tort law
Vehicle law
Transport in Australia